Mangamma Sabatham (alternatively Sapatham or Sabadham) may refer to:
 Mangamma Sabatham (1943 film), 1943 Tamil language film
 Mangamma Sapatham (1965 film), 1965 Telugu language film
 Mangamma Sabadham (1985 film), 1985 Tamil language film

See also
 Mangamma (disambiguation)